The following list is a list of list of Finnish ice hockey arenas by capacity. Only those arenas that host ice hockey games regularly with paid admission and a capacity over 6,000 are included.

Finnish ice hockey arenas by capacity

References

References

Notes 

 
 
Finnish ice hockey arenas
ice hockey arenas